Indian River Mall is an enclosed shopping mall in Vero Beach, Florida. Opened in 1996, it is anchored by Dillard's, AMC Theatres, and JCPenney, with two vacant anchors last occupied by Macy’s and Sears.

History
Edward J. Debartolo Corporation developed Indian River Mall in 1996. Its original anchors were JCPenney, Sears, Dillard's, and Burdines. A food court and 24-screen movie theater were added in 1997.

In 2005, Burdines was renamed by Macy's.

In 2007, a customer found $5,200 inside a pair of shoes he was purchasing.

In 2008, Gap, Disney Store and RJ Gator's closed. The former RJ Gator's will most likely be converted into a new restaurant.

On December 1, 2014, Simon Malls entered into foreclosure on the property for $71 million. The property, including its adjacent plaza was sold at auction for $100 to the highest bidder on May 13, 2015.

In August 2016, Indian River mall sold an adjacent plaza, called the Indian River Plaza, which consists of Best Buy, Ross Dress for Less, Target, Office Depot, Bed Bath & Beyond, Lowe's Home Improvement and Michaels Arts & Crafts.

On August 6, 2019, it was announced that Sears will be closing this location as part of a plan to close 26 stores nationwide. The store closed in October 2019.

On January 8, 2020, it was announced that Macy’s would be closing in April 2020 as part of a plan to close 125 stores nationwide.

In 2020, Victoria's Secret closed at the mall as part of a plan to close 250 stores nationwide. TGI Friday’s closed later that year.

On January 6 2021, Hollister Co. closed

References

External links
Indian River Mall

Shopping malls established in 1996
Buildings and structures in Vero Beach, Florida
Tourist attractions in Indian River County, Florida
1996 establishments in Florida
Kohan Retail Investment Group